The Ciban is a right tributary of the river Sebeș in Romania. It discharges into the Sebeș downstream of the Oașa Dam.

References

Rivers of Romania
Rivers of Sibiu County